This is a list of all the musicians and music groups who reached number one on the Billboard R&B singles chart.

The chart was officially titled as follows:
Oct 1942 – Feb 1945   The Harlem Hit Parade
Feb 1945 – Jun 1949   Race Records
Jun 1949 – Oct 1958   Rhythm & Blues Records
Oct 1958 – Nov 1963   Hot R&B Sides
Nov 1963 – Jan 1965   No chart published
Jan 1965 – Aug 1969   Hot Rhythm & Blues Singles
Aug 1969 – Jul 1973   Best Selling Soul Singles
Jul 1973 – Jun 1982   Hot Soul Singles
Jun 1982 – Oct 1990   Hot Black Singles
Oct 1990 – Jan 1999   Hot R&B Singles
Jan 1999 – Dec 1999   Hot R&B Singles & Tracks
Dec 1999 – Apr 2005   Hot R&B/Hip-Hop Singles & Tracks
April 2005 – present  Hot R&B/Hip-Hop Songs

Lists are alphabetical by year.
NOTE : Annual totals may not sum to 52 weeks because:
sometimes the No. 1 place was shared
totals are counted from the start of the stay at No. 1 - for example, a hit which reached No. 1 in November 1945 and stayed there 11 weeks is included in the 1945 list but not 1946.
As well as the R&B best sellers (BS) chart, between 1948 and 1957 there was also an R&B juke box (JB) chart, and from 1955 to 1958 there was an R&B airplay (JY - jockeys) chart.  These charts were consolidated into one in October 1958. Years at No. 1 on these different charts are listed where appropriate.

1942
Bing Crosby (3 weeks)
Earl Hines (1 week)
Andy Kirk (1 week)
Lucky Millinder (2 weeks)
Freddie Slack  (2 weeks)
Paul Whiteman and Billie Holiday (3 weeks)

1943
Bea Booze  (4 weeks)
Nat "King" Cole  (3 weeks)
Bonnie Davis  (5 weeks)
Duke Ellington  (5 weeks)
Erskine Hawkins  (14 weeks)
Dick Haymes  (4 weeks)
The Ink Spots  (9 weeks)
Harry James  (1 week)
Louis Jordan  (1 week)
Lucky Millinder  (3 weeks)
Ella Mae Morse  (2 weeks)

1944
Benny Carter  (2 weeks)
Nat "King" Cole  (14 weeks)
Duke Ellington  (12 weeks)
Benny Goodman  (1 week)
Lionel Hampton  (6 weeks)
The Ink Spots and Ella Fitzgerald  (12 weeks)
Buddy Johnson  (1 week)
Louis Jordan  (7 weeks)
Johnny Mercer  (1 week)
The Mills Brothers  (1 week)

1945
Cecil Gant  (2 weeks)
Erskine Hawkins  (6 weeks)
Louis Jordan  (8 weeks)
Joe Liggins  (18 weeks)
Lucky Millinder  (8 weeks)
Roosevelt Sykes  (7 weeks)
Cootie Williams  (1 week)

1946
Ella Fitzgerald  (with Louis Jordan) (5 weeks)
Lionel Hampton  (16 weeks)
The Ink Spots  (3 weeks)
Louis Jordan  (35 weeks, inc. 5 weeks with Ella Fitzgerald)

1947
Savannah Churchill (8 weeks)
Louis Jordan (40 weeks)
Julia Lee (12 weeks)
Eddie Vinson (2 weeks)

1948
Roy Brown (1 week JB)
Pee Wee Crayton (1 week BS, 3 weeks JB)
Wynonie Harris (1 week BS, 1 week JB)
Ivory Joe Hunter (3 weeks BS, 3 weeks JB)
Bull Moose Jackson  (11 weeks BS, 7 weeks JB)
Lonnie Johnson  (7 weeks BS, 7 weeks JB)
Louis Jordan  (2 weeks JB)
Julia Lee (9 weeks)
Memphis Slim (2 weeks JB)
Amos Milburn (7 weeks BS, 7 weeks JB)
Red Miller  (4 weeks BS, 5 weeks JB)
The Orioles (1 week JB)
Hal Singer (4 weeks BS, 4 weeks JB)
Arbee Stidham (1 week BS, 1 week JB)
Sonny Thompson  (4 weeks BS, 3 weeks JB)
Dinah Washington (1 week JB)

1949
Charles Brown (15 weeks BS, 11 weeks JB)
Larry Darnell (6 weeks BS, 8 weeks JB)
Wynonie Harris (1 week BS, 2 weeks JB)
John Lee Hooker (1 week JB)
Louis Jordan (12 weeks BS, 12 weeks JB)
Big Jay McNeely (1 week BS, 1 week JB)
Amos Milburn (2 weeks JB)
The Orioles (1 week BS)
Dinah Washington (2 weeks BS, 1 week JB)
Paul Williams (12 weeks BS, 14 weeks JB)
Jimmy Witherspoon (1 week BS)

1950
Roy Brown (3 weeks BS)
Ruth Brown (11 weeks BS, 7 weeks JB)
Nat "King" Cole (4 weeks JB)
Lowell Fulson (1 week BS, 4 weeks JB)
Ivory Joe Hunter (2 weeks BS, 7 weeks JB)
Louis Jordan (7 weeks BS, 4 weeks JB)
Joe Liggins (11 weeks BS, 13 weeks JB)
Percy Mayfield (2 weeks BS, 1 week JB)
Joe Morris (4 weeks BS, 3 weeks JB)
Johnny Otis and Little Esther (13 weeks BS, 10 weeks JB) (9 weeks BS / 5 weeks JB with The Robins, 4 weeks BS / 5 weeks JB with Mel Walker)

1951
Earl Bostic (4 weeks BS)
Jackie Brenston (3 weeks BS, 5 weeks JB)
Charles Brown (13 weeks BS, 14 weeks JB)
The Clovers (8 weeks BS, 3 weeks JB)
The Dominoes (14 weeks BS, 12 weeks JB)
The Five Keys (4 weeks BS, 2 weeks JB)
Lloyd Glenn (2 weeks JB)
Peppermint Harris (1 week BS, 2 weeks JB)
John Lee Hooker (4 weeks JB)
Amos Milburn (1 week BS, 3 weeks JB)
Jimmy Nelson (1 week JB)
Tab Smith (2 weeks BS)

1952
Johnny Ace (9 weeks BS)
Eddie Boyd (2 weeks BS, 7 weeks JB)
Ruth Brown (7 weeks BS, 6 weeks JB)
Tommy Brown with The Griffin Brothers (3 weeks JB)
The Clovers (1 week BS, 1 week JB)
Fats Domino (1 week BS)
The Dominoes (7 weeks BS, 10 weeks JB)
Jimmy Forrest (6 weeks BS, 7 weeks JB)
The Four Blazes (3 weeks JB)
Rosco Gordon (1 week BS)
B. B. King (7 weeks BS, 5 weeks JB)
Little Walter (1 week BS, 8 weeks JB)
Willie Mabon (8 weeks BS, 7 weeks JB)
Lloyd Price (7 weeks BS, 1 week JB)
Johnnie Ray (1 week BS, 1 week JB)

1953
Johnny Ace (5 weeks BS, 4 weeks JB)
Faye Adams (9 weeks BS, 10 weeks JB)
Ruth Brown  (5 weeks BS, 5 weeks JB)
The "5" Royales (8 weeks BS, 8 weeks JB)
B.B. King (3 weeks JB)
Willie Mabon (2 weeks BS)
Clyde McPhatter and The Drifters (11 weeks BS, 1 week JB)
The Orioles (4 weeks BS, 5 weeks JB)
Big Mama Thornton (6 weeks BS, 7 weeks JB)
Big Joe Turner (8 weeks JB)

1954
Faye Adams (6 weeks BS, 5 weeks JB)
Ruth Brown (5 weeks BS, 9 weeks JB)
The Charms (9 weeks BS, 2 weeks JB, 2 weeks JY)
Clyde McPhatter and The Drifters (8 weeks BS, 8 weeks JB)
Guitar Slim (6 weeks BS, 14 weeks JB)
Roy Hamilton (8 weeks BS, 5 weeks JB)
B.B. King (2 weeks JB)
The Midnighters (9 weeks BS, 4 weeks JB)
Big Joe Turner (3 weeks JB)

1955
Johnny Ace (9 weeks BS, 9 weeks JB, 10 weeks JY)
Chuck Berry (9 weeks BS, 11 weeks JB, 9 weeks JY)
Ray Charles (1 week JB, 1 week JY)
Bo Diddley (2 weeks JB)
Fats Domino (11 weeks BS, 8 weeks JB, 10 weeks JY)
The Drifters (1 week JB)
Roy Hamilton (3 weeks BS)
Al Hibbler (1 week JB)
Etta James (4 weeks JY)
Little Walter ( 4 weeks BS, 5 weeks JB, 2 weeks JY)
Jay McShann (3 weeks BS, 2 weeks JB, 2 weeks JY)
The Moonglows (2 weeks JB, 1 week JY)
The Penguins (3 weeks BS, 3 weeks JB, 1 week JY)
The Platters (7 weeks BS, 6 weeks JB, 5 weeks JY)

1956
Ray Charles (2 weeks JB, 1 week JY)
Bill Doggett (13 weeks BS, 1 week JB, 5 weeks JY)
Fats Domino (15 weeks BS, 17 weeks JB, 20 weeks JY)
The El Dorados (1 week JB)
Little Willie John (3 weeks BS, 1 week JB, 5 weeks JY)
Little Richard (8 weeks BS, 9 weeks JB, 5 weeks JY)
Frankie Lymon and The Teenagers (5 weeks BS, 2 weeks JY)
Clyde McPhatter (1 week JB)
The Platters (10 weeks BS, 11 weeks JB, 13 weeks JY)
Elvis Presley (1 week BS, 6 weeks JB)
Shirley and Lee (3 weeks JB, 3 weeks JY)

1957
Paul Anka (2 weeks BS)
LaVern Baker (1 week JY)
Chuck Berry (1 week BS, 1 week JB, 5 weeks JY)
Bobby Bland (2 weeks JY)
The Bobbettes (4 weeks JY)
The Coasters (13 weeks BS, 2 weeks JB, 7 weeks JY)
Nat "King" Cole (2 weeks JY)
Sam Cooke (6 weeks BS, 6 weeks JY)
Fats Domino (14 weeks BS, 13 weeks JB, 12 weeks JY)
The Everly Brothers (1 week JY)
Ivory Joe Hunter (3 weeks JB, 1 week JY)
Jerry Lee Lewis (2 weeks BS, 1 week JY)
Little Richard (2 weeks JB)
Clyde McPhatter (1 week JY)
Mickey & Sylvia (2 weeks JY)
Elvis Presley (10 weeks BS, 4 weeks JB, 5 weeks JY)
Jimmie Rodgers (2 weeks BS, 1 week JY)
Larry Williams (1 week JY)
Chuck Willis (2 weeks JY)

1958
Chuck Berry (3 weeks BS, 3 weeks JY)
The Champs (4 weeks BS, 4 weeks JY)
Jimmy Clanton (1 week BS)
The Coasters (7 weeks BS, 6 weeks JY)
Cozy Cole (6 weeks)
Sam Cooke (1 week JY)
Danny & The Juniors (5 weeks BS)
Bobby Darin (2 weeks JY)
Bobby Day (3 weeks JY)
Tommy Edwards (3 weeks BS)
The Elegants (4 weeks BS, 4 weeks JY)
The Everly Brothers (5 weeks BS, 3 weeks JY)
Ernie Freeman (2 weeks JY)
Bill Justis (1 week JY)
The Kalin Twins (1 week JY)
Clyde McPhatter (1 week)
The Platters (3 weeks BS)
Perez Prado (2 weeks BS, 1 week JY)
Elvis Presley (3 weeks JY)
David Seville (1 week JY)
The Silhouettes (4 weeks BS, 6 weeks JY)
Chuck Willis (1 week JY)
Jackie Wilson (7 weeks)

1959
Brook Benton (16 weeks)
James Brown (1 week)
Ray Charles (1 week)
The Coasters (4 weeks)
Fats Domino (1 week)
The Drifters (1 week)
Wilbert Harrison (7 weeks)
Phil Phillips (1 week)
Lloyd Price (11 weeks)
Della Reese (2 weeks)
The Spacemen (3 weeks)
Jackie Wilson (1 week)

1960
Hank Ballard and The Midnighters (3 weeks)
Brook Benton (23 weeks, inc. 14 weeks with Dinah Washington)
Bill Black (8 weeks)
Buster Brown (1 week)
Jerry Butler (7 weeks)
The Drifters (1 week)
The Everly Brothers (1 week)
Bobby Marchan (1 week)
Dinah Washington (15 weeks, inc. 14 weeks with Brook Benton)
Jackie Wilson (7 weeks)

1961
Bobby Bland (1 week)
Ray Charles (6 weeks)
Chubby Checker (2 weeks)
Lee Dorsey (1 week)
The Jive Five (3 weeks)
Ernie K-Doe (5 weeks)
Ben E. King (4 weeks)
Bobby Lewis (10 weeks)
The Marcels (2 weeks)
The Marvelettes (7 weeks)
The Miracles (8 weeks)
The Pips (1 week)

1962
Booker T. & the MGs (4 weeks)
Gene Chandler (5 weeks)
Ray Charles (15 weeks)
Sam Cooke (3 weeks)
King Curtis (2 weeks)
The Four Seasons (1 week)
Barbara George (4 weeks)
Little Eva (3 weeks)
Barbara Lynn (3 weeks)
Esther Phillips (3 weeks)
Dee Dee Sharp (4 weeks)
Mary Wells (1 week)

1963
Bobby Bland (2 weeks)
The Chiffons (4 weeks)
Sam Cooke (1 week)
The Essex (2 weeks)
Jimmy Gilmer and the Fireballs (1 week)
Lesley Gore (3 weeks)
The Impressions (2 weeks)
Barbara Lewis (2 weeks)
Little Peggy March (1 week)
Martha and the Vandellas (4 weeks)
Garnet Mimms and the Enchanters (3 weeks)
The Miracles (1 week)
Paul and Paula (2 weeks)
Ruby and the Romantics (2 weeks)
Jimmy Soul (1 week)
Little Johnny Taylor (1 week)
Mary Wells (4 weeks)
Jackie Wilson (3 weeks)
Little Stevie Wonder (6 weeks)

1964
NOTE: No R&B charts were published between November 1963 and January 1965.  The following R&B artists (as assessed by Joel Whitburn) had No. 1 hits on the Billboard Hot 100 pop chart during that period :
The Dixie Cups (3 weeks)
The Shangri-Las (1 week)
The Supremes (6 weeks)
Mary Wells (2 weeks)

1965
Fontella Bass (4 weeks)
James Brown (14 weeks)
Solomon Burke (3 weeks)
The Four Tops (9 weeks)
Marvin Gaye (2 weeks)
Little Milton (3 weeks)
Wilson Pickett (1 week)
The Supremes (1 week)
The Temptations (6 weeks)
Joe Tex (3 weeks)
Jr. Walker & the All Stars (4 weeks)

1966
James Brown (2 weeks)
Ray Charles (1 week)
Eddie Floyd (1 week)
The Four Tops (2 weeks)
Slim Harpo (2 weeks)
Wilson Pickett (8 weeks)
Lou Rawls (1 week)
Sam & Dave (1 week)
Percy Sledge (4 weeks)
The Supremes (6 weeks)
The Temptations (16 weeks)
Joe Tex (1 week)
Stevie Wonder (6 weeks)

1967
James Brown (3 weeks)
Aretha Franklin (17 weeks)
Gladys Knight & The Pips (6 weeks)
Martha and the Vandellas (1 week)
Aaron Neville (5 weeks)
Wilson Pickett (1 week)
Sam & Dave (7 weeks)
Freddie Scott (4 weeks)
The Supremes (2 weeks)
Bettye Swann (2 weeks)
Jackie Wilson (1 week)
Stevie Wonder (4 weeks)

1968
Archie Bell & The Drells (2 weeks)
James Brown (8 weeks)
Jerry Butler (1 week)
The Dells (3 weeks)
Aretha Franklin (10 weeks)
Marvin Gaye (13 weeks, inc. 6 weeks with Tammi Terrell)
The Intruders (1 week)
Hugh Masekela (4 weeks)
Otis Redding (3 weeks)
Smokey Robinson & The Miracles (1 week)
Johnnie Taylor (3 weeks)
The Temptations (4 weeks)
Stevie Wonder (1 week)

1969
James Brown (4 weeks)
Jerry Butler (2 weeks)
Tyrone Davis (3 weeks)
The Dells (1 week)
Aretha Franklin (5 weeks)
Marvin Gaye (6 weeks)
The Impressions (1 week)
The Isley Brothers (4 weeks)
The Originals (5 weeks)
Diana Ross and The Supremes (4 weeks)
Joe Simon (3 weeks)
Sly & The Family Stone (2 weeks)
The Temptations (7 weeks)
Jr. Walker & the All Stars (2 weeks)

1970
Brook Benton (1 week)
James Brown (2 weeks)
Tyrone Davis (2 weeks)
Aretha Franklin (5 weeks)
The Jackson Five (20 weeks)
The Moments (5 weeks)
Smokey Robinson & The Miracles (3 weeks)
Diana Ross (1 week)
Sly & The Family Stone (5 weeks)
The Supremes (1 week)
Stevie Wonder (6 weeks)

1971
James Brown (3 weeks)
The Chi-Lites (2 weeks)
King Floyd (4 weeks)
Aretha Franklin (5 weeks)
Marvin Gaye (9 weeks)
The Honey Cone (5 weeks)
The Jackson Five (3 weeks)
Gladys Knight & The Pips (1 week)
Jean Knight (5 weeks)
Denise LaSalle (1 week)
The Persuaders (2 weeks)
Wilson Pickett (1 week)
Sly & The Family Stone (5 weeks)
Johnnie Taylor (2 weeks)
The Temptations (3 weeks)
Rufus Thomas (2 weeks)

1972
James Brown (5 weeks)
The Chi-Lites (2 weeks)
The Dramatics (4 weeks)
Roberta Flack and Donny Hathaway (1 week)
Aretha Franklin (2 weeks)
Al Green (12 weeks)
Luther Ingram (4 weeks)
Harold Melvin & the Blue Notes (2 weeks)
The O'Jays (1 week)
Billy Paul (4 weeks)
Billy Preston (1 week)
Joe Simon (2 weeks)
The Spinners (5 weeks)
The Staple Singers (4 weeks)
Joe Tex (1 week)
Bill Withers (1 week)
Bobby Womack (1 week)

1973
Aretha Franklin (2 weeks)
Marvin Gaye (6 weeks)
The Independents (1 week)
Eddie Kendricks (2 weeks)
Gladys Knight & The Pips (8 weeks)
Harold Melvin & the Blue Notes (2 weeks)
The Ohio Players (1 week)
The O'Jays (4 weeks)
Billy Preston (1 week)
The Spinners (5 weeks)
The Staple Singers (3 weeks)
Sylvia (2 weeks)
Johnnie Taylor (2 weeks)
The Temptations (2 weeks)
Timmy Thomas (2 weeks)
Fred Wesley & The J.B.s (2 weeks)
Barry White (2 weeks)
Stevie Wonder (6 weeks)

1974
Blue Magic (1 week)
James Brown (5 weeks)
Shirley Brown (2 weeks)
B.T. Express (1 week)
William DeVaughn (1 week)
Roberta Flack (5 weeks)
Aretha Franklin (3 weeks)
Al Green (1 week)
The Impressions (2 weeks)
The Jackson Five (1 week)
Eddie Kendricks (3 weeks)
Gladys Knight & The Pips (5 weeks)
Kool & The Gang (2 weeks)
Latimore (2 weeks)
George McCrae (2 weeks)
MFSB featuring The Three Degrees (1 week)
Rufus featuring Chaka Khan (1 week)
The Spinners (2 weeks)
Tavares (1 week)
The Temptations (1 week)
Barry White (3 weeks)
Bobby Womack (3 weeks)
Stevie Wonder (4 weeks)

1975
B.T. Express (1 week)
Natalie Cole (2 weeks)
The Commodores (1 week)
Carl Douglas (1 week)
Earth, Wind & Fire (2 weeks)
Faith Hope & Charity (1 week)
Graham Central Station (1 week)
Al Green (3 weeks)
Major Harris (1 week)
The Isley Brothers (3 weeks)
K.C. & The Sunshine Band (2 weeks)
Eddie Kendricks (1 week)
Ben E. King (1 week)
Kool & The Gang (1 week)
LaBelle (1 week)
Love Unlimited (1 week)
Van McCoy (1 week)
Gwen McCrae (1 week)
The Moments (1 week)
New Birth (1 week)
The Ohio Players (4 weeks)
The O'Jays (2 weeks)
Sharon Paige with Harold Melvin & the Blue Notes (1 week)
Peoples Choice (1 week)
The Pointer Sisters (2 weeks)
Smokey Robinson (1 week)
Shirley and Company (1 week)
Silver Convention (1 week)
Joe Simon (2 weeks)
The Spinners (1 week)
The Staple Singers (2 weeks)
Tavares (1 week)
The Temptations (2 weeks)
War (1 week)
Barry White (2 weeks)

1976
Brass Construction (1 week)
Brick (4 weeks)
The Brothers Johnson (1 week)
Natalie Cole (2 weeks)
The Commodores (2 weeks)
Tyrone Davis (1 week)
Earth, Wind & Fire (4 weeks)
Aretha Franklin (4 weeks)
Marvin Gaye (1 week)
K.C. & The Sunshine Band (4 weeks)
L.T.D. (2 weeks)
The Manhattans (1 week)
Marilyn McCoo and Billy Davis Jr. (1 week)
Harold Melvin & the Blue Notes  (2 weeks)
The Ohio Players (1 week)
The O'Jays (3 weeks)
Lou Rawls (2 weeks)
Rose Royce (2 weeks)
Diana Ross (1 week)
David Ruffin (1 week)
Rufus featuring Chaka Khan (2 weeks)
The Spinners (1 week)
Candi Staton (1 week)
The Sylvers (1 week)
Johnnie Taylor (6 weeks)
Wild Cherry (2 weeks)

1977
William Bell (1 week)
The Brothers Johnson (1 week)
Natalie Cole (5 weeks)
The Commodores (1 week)
Earth, Wind & Fire (7 weeks)
The Emotions (4 weeks)
The Floaters (6 weeks)
Aretha Franklin (1 week)
Marvin Gaye (5 weeks)
Thelma Houston (1 week)
The Isley Brothers (1 week)
K.C. & The Sunshine Band (1 week)
L.T.D. (2 weeks)
The O'Jays (1 week)
Rufus featuring Chaka Khan (2 weeks)
Slave (1 week)
Tavares (1 week)
Barry White (5 weeks)
Stevie Wonder (6 weeks)

1978
Bootsy's Rubber Band (1 week)
Chic (5 weeks)
Natalie Cole (2 weeks)
The Commodores (3 weeks)
Con Funk Shun (2 weeks)
Earth, Wind & Fire (1 week)
Enchantment (1 week)
Roberta Flack and Donny Hathaway (2 weeks)
Foxy (2 weeks)
Funkadelic (6 weeks)
The Isley Brothers (2 weeks)
Rick James (2 weeks)
Quincy Jones (1 week)
Chaka Khan (3 weeks)
L.T.D. (2 weeks)
Johnny Mathis and Deniece Williams (4 weeks)
The O'Jays (5 weeks)
Parliament (3 weeks)
Teddy Pendergrass (2 weeks)
Stargard (2 weeks)
A Taste Of Honey (1 week)

1979
Chuck Brown & The Soul Searchers (4 weeks)
Chic (6 weeks)
The Commodores (1 week)
Earth, Wind & Fire (1 week)
Funkadelic (3 weeks)
G.Q. (2 weeks)
Instant Funk (3 weeks)
The Isley Brothers (1 week)
Michael Jackson (5 weeks)
Kool & The Gang (3 weeks)
Cheryl Lynn (1 week)
McFadden & Whitehead (1 week)
Parliament (4 weeks)
Peaches & Herb (4 weeks)
Prince (2 weeks)
Rufus and Chaka Khan (3 weeks)
Sister Sledge (2 weeks)
Donna Summer (1 week)
Anita Ward (5 weeks)

1980
George Benson (3 weeks)
The Brothers Johnson (2 weeks)
Tom Browne (4 weeks)
Larry Graham (2 weeks)
The Isley Brothers (4 weeks)
Jermaine Jackson (6 weeks)
Michael Jackson (6 weeks)
Kool & The Gang (6 weeks)
Ray, Goodman & Brown (1 week)
Diana Ross (4 weeks)
Shalamar (1 week)
The S.O.S. Band (5 weeks)
The Whispers (5 weeks)
Stevie Wonder (7 weeks)

1981
Earth, Wind & Fire (8 weeks)
The Four Tops (2 weeks)
The Gap Band (2 weeks)
Rick James (5 weeks)
Chaka Khan (2 weeks)
Evelyn King (1 week)
Kool & The Gang (1 week)
Lakeside (2 weeks)
Ray Parker Jr. & Raydio (2 weeks)
Smokey Robinson (5 weeks)
Roger (2 weeks)
Diana Ross and Lionel Richie (7 weeks)
Frankie Smith (4 weeks)
A Taste Of Honey (1 week)
Luther Vandross (2 weeks)
Yarbrough & Peoples (5 weeks)

1982
George Benson (1 week)
The Dazz Band (5 weeks)
Richard "Dimples" Fields (3 weeks)
Aretha Franklin (4 weeks)
The Gap Band (3 weeks)
Marvin Gaye (10 weeks)
Daryl Hall & John Oates (1 week)
Jennifer Holliday (4 weeks)
Evelyn King (5 weeks)
Skyy (2 weeks)
Deniece Williams (2 weeks)
Stevie Wonder (9 weeks)
Zapp (2 weeks)

1983
George Clinton (4 weeks)
DeBarge (5 weeks)
Aretha Franklin (2 weeks)
The Gap Band (1 week)
Michael Jackson (13 weeks, inc. 3 weeks with Paul McCartney)
Rick James (6 weeks)
Gladys Knight & The Pips (1 week)
Mtume (8 weeks)
New Edition (1 week)
Lionel Richie (7 weeks)
Rufus and Chaka Khan (1 week)
Donna Summer (3 weeks)

1984
Ashford & Simpson (3 weeks)
Cameo (4 weeks)
Chaka Khan (3 weeks)
Kool & The Gang (2 weeks)
Patti LaBelle (4 weeks)
Cheryl Lynn (1 week)
Midnight Star (5 weeks)
New Edition (1 week)
O'Bryan (1 week)
Billy Ocean (4 weeks)
Ray Parker Jr. (2 weeks)
Prince (9 weeks)
Lionel Richie (3 weeks)
Rockwell (5 weeks)
Deniece Williams (3 weeks)
Stevie Wonder (3 weeks)
Yarbrough & Peoples (1 week)

1985
The Commodores (4 weeks)
DeBarge (1 week)
Aretha Franklin (5 weeks)
Whitney Houston (2 weeks)
Isley Jasper Isley (3 weeks)
Freddie Jackson (8 weeks)
Kool & The Gang (2 weeks)
Loose Ends (1 week)
Maze featuring Frankie Beverly (2 weeks)
New Edition (3 weeks)
Ready For The World (2 weeks)
Rene & Angela (2 weeks)
Diana Ross (3 weeks)
USA for Africa (2 weeks)
Eugene Wilde (4 weeks)
Stevie Wonder (6 weeks)

1986
Gregory Abbott (2 weeks)
Bobby Brown (2 weeks)
Cameo (3 weeks)
Jean Carn (2 weeks)
El DeBarge (1 week)
Gwen Guthrie (1 week)
Whitney Houston (1 week)
Freddie Jackson (5 weeks inc. 1 week with Melba Moore)
Janet Jackson (4 weeks)
Oran "Juice" Jones (2 weeks)
Shirley Jones (2 weeks)
Patti LaBelle & Michael McDonald (4 weeks)
Levert (1 week)
Stephanie Mills (2 weeks)
Melba Moore with Freddie Jackson (1 week)
Meli'sa Morgan (3 weeks)
Billy Ocean (3 weeks)
Prince (4 weeks)
Ready For The World (2 weeks)
Rene & Angela (1 week)
Lionel Richie (2 weeks)
Timex Social Club (2 weeks)
Dionne Warwick with Elton John, Gladys Knight and Stevie Wonder (3 weeks)

1987
Herb Alpert with Janet Jackson (2 weeks)
Atlantic Starr (2 weeks)
Cameo (2 weeks)
Earth, Wind & Fire (1 week)
Force M.D.'s (2 weeks)
Freddie Jackson (3 weeks)
Janet Jackson (5 weeks, inc. 2 with Herb Alpert)
Michael Jackson (8 weeks)
Levert (2 weeks)
Lisa Lisa and Cult Jam (3 weeks)
L.L. Cool J (1 week)
Loose Ends (1 week)
Stephanie Mills (4 weeks)
Melba Moore (1 week)
The O'Jays (1 week)
Alexander O'Neal (2 weeks)
Prince (3 weeks)
Roger (1 week)
The System (1 week)
Luther Vandross (3 weeks, inc. 1 with Gregory Hines)
Jody Watley (3 weeks)
The Whispers (1 week)
Angela Winbush (2 weeks)
Stevie Wonder (2 weeks)

1988
Al B. Sure! (5 weeks)
Anita Baker (2 weeks)
The Boys (1 week)
Bobby Brown (4 weeks)
Cherrelle (1 week)
Terence Trent D'Arby (1 week)
Morris Day (2 weeks)
E.U. (1 week)
Freddie Jackson (4 weeks)
Michael Jackson (2 weeks)
Rick James feat. Roxanne Shante (1 week)
Johnny Kemp (2 weeks)
Gladys Knight & The Pips (1 week)
Levert (2 weeks)
The Mac Band featuring the McCampbell Brothers (1 week)
Teena Marie (1 week)
Ziggy Marley & The Melody Makers (2 weeks)
George Michael (1 week)
Billy Ocean (1 week)
Jeffrey Osborne (1 week)
Pebbles (3 weeks)
Teddy Pendergrass (2 weeks)
Cheryl Pepsii Riley (1 week)
Sade (1 week)
Keith Sweat (3 weeks)
Tony! Toni! Tone! (1 week)
Luther Vandross (1 week)
Karyn White (1 week)
Stevie Wonder (1 week)

1989
Atlantic Starr (1 week)
Babyface (2 weeks)
Anita Baker (1 week)
Regina Belle (1 week)
Chuckii Booker (1 week)
The Boys (1 week)
Bobby Brown (2 weeks)
Peabo Bryson (1 week)
Natalie Cole (1 week)
De La Soul (1 week)
Roberta Flack (1 week)
Eric Gable (1 week)
The Gap Band (2 weeks)
Miki Howard (1 week)
Janet Jackson (2 weeks)
Jermaine Jackson (1 week)
Levert (1 week)
Maze feat. Frankie Beverly (2 weeks)
Stephanie Mills (2 weeks)
New Edition (2 weeks)
The O'Jays (2 weeks)
Prince (1 week)
Teddy Riley feat. Guy (1 week)
Skyy (2 weeks)
Soul II Soul (3 weeks)
Surface (5 weeks)
Today (1 week)
Luther Vandross (2 weeks)
Jody Watley (1 week)
Karyn White (5 weeks)
Vanessa Williams (2 weeks)

1990
After 7 (3 weeks)
Al B. Sure! (2 weeks, inc. 1 week with Quincy Jones)
Babyface (1 week)
Bell Biv DeVoe (3 weeks)
Regina Belle (1 week)
The Boys (1 week)
Mariah Carey (3 weeks)
En Vogue (3 weeks)
Johnny Gill (5 weeks, inc. 2 weeks with Stacy Lattisaw)
Whitney Houston (2 weeks)
Janet Jackson (2 weeks)
Quincy Jones (4 weeks, inc. 2 weeks with Ray Charles and Chaka Khan; 1 week with Al B. Sure!, James Ingram, El DeBarge and Barry White; 1 week with Tevin Campbell)
Stacy Lattisaw with Johnny Gill (2 weeks)
M.C. Hammer (1 week)
Pebbles (3 weeks)
Prince (1 week)
Samuelle (2 weeks)
Skyy (1 week)
Lisa Stansfield (3 weeks)
Keith Sweat (1 week)
The Time (1 week)
Tony! Toni! Tone! (6 weeks)
Ralph Tresvant (1 week)
Troop (3 weeks)
Ruby Turner (1 week)

1991
Boyz II Men (1 week)
Peabo Bryson (2 weeks)
Mariah Carey (1 week)
C & C Music Factory feat. Freedom Williams (1 week)
Color Me Badd (3 weeks)
Damian Dame (2 weeks)
DJ Jazzy Jeff & the Fresh Prince (1 week)
En Vogue (1 week)
Lisa Fischer (2 weeks)
Johnny Gill (1 week)
Hi-Five (3 weeks)
Whitney Houston (2 weeks)
Phyllis Hyman (1 week)
Freddie Jackson (3 weeks)
Jodeci (2 weeks)
Levert (1 week)
Gerald Levert (1 week)
Lisa Lisa and Cult Jam (1 week)
Pebbles (2 weeks)
Teddy Pendergrass (1 week)
Phil Perry (1 week)
The Rude Boys (2 weeks)
Shanice (4 weeks)
Tracie Spencer (1 week)
Surface (1 week)
Keith Sweat (1 week)
Tony! Toni! Tone! (2 weeks)
Luther Vandross (2 weeks)
Keith Washington (1 week)
Karyn White (1 week)
Christopher Williams (1 week)
Vanessa Williams (2 weeks)
BeBe & CeCe Winans (3 weeks, inc. 1 week feat. Mavis Staples)

1992
Al B. Sure! (1 week)
Mariah Carey (3 weeks)
Arrested Development (1 week)
Mary J. Blige (3 weeks)
Chuckii Booker (1 week)
Boyz II Men (5 weeks)
Bobby Brown (2 weeks)
Tevin Campbell (2 weeks)
En Vogue (3 weeks)
Aaron Hall (2 weeks)
Whitney Houston (11 weeks)
Miki Howard (1 week)
Michael Jackson (3 weeks)
Jodeci (4 weeks)
Glenn Jones (1 week)
R. Kelly and Public Announcement (3 weeks)
Gerald Levert (1 week)
Lo-Key? (1 week)
Prince (1 week)
Lionel Richie (1 week)
Lisa Stansfield (1 week)
Keith Sweat (2 weeks)
TLC (2 weeks)
Troop (1 week)
Luther Vandross and Janet Jackson with BBD and Ralph Tresvant (1 week)
Vanessa Williams (3 weeks)

1993
Tevin Campbell (3 weeks)
Dr. Dre featuring Snoop Doggy Dogg (2 weeks)
D.R.S. (6 weeks)
Mariah Carey (10 weeks)
H-Town (4 weeks)
Ice Cube featuring Das EFX (1 week)
Janet Jackson (4 weeks)
Jodeci (4 weeks)
Naughty By Nature (1 week)
Silk (8 weeks)
SWV (Sisters With Voices) (9 weeks)
Tag Team (1 week)
Xscape (4 weeks)

1994
Aaliyah (3 weeks)
Mariah Carey (2 weeks)
Boyz II Men (9 weeks)
Brandy (4 weeks)
Janet Jackson (10 weeks)
Jodeci (4 weeks)
R. Kelly (12 weeks)
TLC (9 weeks)
Barry White (3 weeks)
Xscape (2 weeks)

1995
Brandy (4 weeks)
Mariah Carey (6 weeks)
Whitney Houston (8 weeks)
Michael Jackson (4 weeks)
Montell Jordan (7 weeks)
R. Kelly (1 week)
Method Man feat. Mary J. Blige (3 weeks)
Monica (2 weeks)
The Notorious B.I.G. (9 weeks)
Shaggy (1 week)
Soul For Real (3 weeks)
Xscape (1 week)

1996
Monica (2 weeks)
Mary J. Blige (5 weeks)
R. Kelly (15 weeks inc. 1 with Ronald Isley)
SWV (1 week)
Mariah Carey (1 week)
Bone Thugs N Harmony (7 weeks)
Toni Braxton (2 weeks)
2Pac (3 weeks)
K-Ci & JoJo (3 weeks with 2Pac)
Roger Troutman (3 weeks with 2Pac)
Keith Sweat (6 weeks inc. 3 with Athena Cage)
New Edition (3 weeks)
Aaliyah (2 weeks)
Az Yet (1 week)
Blackstreet (4 weeks)
Dr. Dre (4 weeks with Blackstreet)
Ginuwine (2 weeks)

1997
En Vogue (1 week)
Mariah Carey (3 weeks)
Erykah Badu (2 weeks)
Dru Hill (3 weeks)
Puff Daddy (14 weeks)
The Notorious B.I.G. (3 weeks)
Changing Faces (7 weeks)
Mase (6 weeks with Puff Daddy)
Faith Evans (8 weeks with Puff Daddy)
Usher (11 weeks)
LSG (7 weeks)
Boyz II Men (2 weeks)
112 (8 weeks with Puff Daddy)

1998
Boyz II Men (1 week)
LSG (2 weeks)
Usher (8 weeks)
Destiny's Child (1 week)
Montell Jordan (3 weeks)
Next (3 weeks)
Janet Jackson (2 weeks)
Brandy (8 weeks)
Monica (14 weeks)
Kelly Price (5 weeks)
Dru Hill (3 weeks)
Deborah Cox (8 weeks)

Sources

Rhythm and blues
Rhythm and blues